Mahaday is a town in the southwestern Middle Shabelle (Shabeellaha Dhexe) province of Somalia.

Overview
Mahaday is located about 118 km north of Mogadishu, the nation's capital.

It is located along the Shebelle River, and is the center of the Mahaday District.

Demographics
Mahaday has a population of around 10,000 inhabitants. The broader Mahaday District has a total population of 51,230 residents. The town is primarily inhabited by the harti Abgaal clan of the larger Abgaal Mudulood clan

References

Populated places in Middle Shabelle